Digital Address Code is a proposed unique identification number to each and every address in India by the Department of Post and draft Approach Paper released to public for comments. Digital Address Code ( DAC) will be assigned to all types of addresses in the country ranging from Independent Houses, individual building, Every Flat in the given apartment, every Shop in a commercial Building and every individual unit in an office complex.

References

Unique identifiers
Ministry of Communications and Information Technology (India)
Postal system of India

External links
 Digital Address Code